FC Karpaty Halych is a professional Ukrainian football club from the historical city of Halych.

The team is currently playing Ukrainian Second League after competing in the Ukrainian Amateur championship. The club was formed back in 1949 as Kolhospnyk Halych, part of the Kolos sports society. In 2000–2009 it was a farm club of FC Enerhetyk Burshtyn.

History

The team was founded in 1949. The club also represents the city of Burshtyn and in 2000–2009 was a farm club of FC Enerhetyk Burshtyn. In 2019 the club merged with Enerhetyk Burshtyn. Since 2020 it serves as a farm club of FC Karpaty Lviv.

"Karpaty" debuted in the Ukrainian Second League in the 2020–21 season.

Former names
 First formation
 1949–1964 Kolhospnyk Halych
 Second formation
 1967–1983 Dynamo Halych
 Third formation
 1984–1993 Dnister Halych
 1993–2000 Halychyna Halych
 2000–2010 Enerhetyk-Halychyna-2 Halych (second team of FC Enerhetyk Burshtyn)
 Fourth formation
 2009–2009 Dnister Halych
 2009–2017 Hal-Vapno Halych
 2017–2018 Halych
 2018– Karpaty Halych

Current squad
As of 13 October 2022

League and cup history

{|class="wikitable"
|-bgcolor="#efefef"
! Season
! Div.
! Pos.
! Pl.
! W
! D
! L
! GS
! GA
! P
!Domestic Cup
!colspan=2|Europe
!Notes
|-bgcolor=SteelBlue
|align=center|2019–20
|align=center|4th
|align=center|4
|align=center|
|align=center|
|align=center|
|align=center|
|align=center|
|align=center|
|align=center|
|align=center|
|align=center|
|align=center|
|align=center bgcolor=lightgreen|Promoted
|-bgcolor=PowderBlue
|align=center|2020–21
|align=center|3rd
|align=center|5
|align=center|	
|align=center|	 	
|align=center|		
|align=center|
|align=center|	 	 	
|align=center|	
|align=center|
|align=center|
|align=center|
|align=center|
|align=center|
|}

Managers
 2018–2019 Andriy Nesteruk
 2019–2020 Petro Rusak
 2020–2021 Roman Hnativ
 2021 Lyubomyr Vovchyk
 2021–present Carlos Inarejos

References

External links
 Profile at AAFU

 
Ukrainian Second League clubs
Football clubs in Ivano-Frankivsk Oblast
Sport in Halych
Sport in Burshtyn
1949 establishments in Ukraine
Association football clubs established in 1949